R. Saroja is an Indian politician and former Member of the Legislative Assembly of Tamil Nadu. She was elected to the Tamil Nadu legislative assembly as an Anna Dravida Munnetra Kazhagam candidate from Uppiliyapuram constituency in 1984 and 2001 elections.

References 

All India Anna Dravida Munnetra Kazhagam politicians
Living people
20th-century Indian women politicians
20th-century Indian politicians
Year of birth missing (living people)
Tamil Nadu MLAs 1985–1989
Women members of the Tamil Nadu Legislative Assembly